Oxylides faunus, the common false head, is a butterfly in the family Lycaenidae. It is found in Guinea-Bissau, Guinea, Sierra Leone, Liberia, Ivory Coast, Ghana, Togo, Nigeria and Cameroon. The habitat consists of primary forests.

Both sexes are attracted to flowers.

Subspecies
 Oxylides faunus faunus (Guinea-Bissau, Guinea, Sierra Leone, Liberia, Ivory Coast, Ghana, Togo, Nigeria)
 Oxylides faunus camerunica Libert, 2004 (Nigeria: Cross River loop, Cameroon)

References

External links
Die Gross-Schmetterlinge der Erde 13: Die Afrikanischen Tagfalter. Plate XIII 68 a

Butterflies described in 1773
Theclinae
Butterflies of Africa
Taxa named by Dru Drury